Ladies of the Canyon may refer to:
Ladies of the Canyon (album), a 1970 album by Canadian singer-songwriter Joni Mitchell
"Ladies of the Canyon" (song), the title track of that album
Ladies of the Canyon (band), a Canadian roots rock band from Montreal, Quebec